Hoffman's packing puzzle is an assembly puzzle named after Dean G. Hoffman, who described it in 1978. The puzzle consists of 27 identical rectangular cuboids, each of whose edges have three different lengths. Its goal is to assemble them all to fit within a cube whose edge length is the sum of the three lengths.

 writes that the first person to solve the puzzle was David A. Klarner, and that typical solution times can range from 20 minutes to multiple hours.

Construction
The puzzle itself consists only of 27 identical rectangular cuboid-shaped blocks, although physical realizations of the puzzle also typically supply a cubical box to fit the blocks into.
Although the puzzle can be constructed with any three different edge lengths, it is most difficult when the three edge lengths of the blocks are close enough together that , as this prevents alternative solutions in which four blocks of the minimum width are packed next to each other. Additionally, having the three lengths form an arithmetic progression can make it more confusing, because in this case placing three blocks of the middle width next to each other produces a row of the correct total width but one that cannot lead to a valid solution to the whole puzzle.

Mathematical analysis
Each valid solution to the puzzle arranges the blocks in an approximate  grid of blocks, with the sides of the blocks all parallel to the sides of the outer cube, and with one block of each width along each axis-parallel line of three blocks. Counting reflections and rotations as being the same solution as each other, the puzzle has 21 combinatorially distinct solutions.

The total volume of the pieces, is less than the volume  of the cube that they pack into. The fact that the pieces have less total volume than the cube follows from the inequality of arithmetic and geometric means.

Table of solutions
The 21 distinct solutions are tabulated here as described by the references cited above .

All boxes below are entered in the format (east-west length) x (north-south length) x (up-down length), denoting the size of each box with the dimensions A, B, and C, where A < B < C. (In the above example, A = 4, B = 5, and C = 6).

All 3x3 matrices describe a set of 9 boxes, with east-west neighbors along each row and north-south neighbors down each column, with the three stacked layers being listed in sequence for each solution.

Higher dimensions

A two-dimensional analogue of the puzzle asks to pack four identical rectangles of side lengths  and  into a square of side length ; as the figure shows, this is always possible. In  dimensions the puzzle asks to pack  identical blocks into a hypercube. By a result of Raphael M. Robinson this is again solvable whenever  for two numbers  and  such that the - and -dimensional cases are themselves solvable. For instance, according to this result, it is solvable for dimensions 4, 6, 8, 9, and other 3-smooth numbers. In all dimensions, the inequality of arithmetic and geometric means shows that the volume of the pieces is less than the volume of the hypercube into which they should be packed. However, it is unknown whether the puzzle can be solved in five dimensions, or in higher prime number dimensions.

References

Mechanical puzzle cubes
Packing problems